Badran is an Arabic-origin surname. People with the surname are as follows:

Abdullah Badran (1983–2005), Palestinian suicide bomber 
Adnan Badran (born 1935), Jordanian scientist, academic and politician
Hagar Badran (born 1989), Egyptian synchronized swimmer
Husam Badran, Hamas leader in the West Bank
Jacqueline Badran (born 1961), Swiss-Australian businesswoman and politician
Mudar Badran (born 1934), Jordanian politician, minister and industrialist
Nuri Badran (born 1943), Iraqi politician and government minister
Rasem Badran (born 1945), Palestinian Jordanian architect 
Samir Badran (born 1990), Swedish television personality and singer of Palestinian descent 
Shams Badran (1929–2020), Egyptian politician and government minister

Surnames of Arabic origin